Hartley Sawyer (born January 25, 1985) is an American actor. He is known for his roles as Kyle Abbott on the CBS Daytime soap opera The Young and the Restless and Ralph Dibny / Elongated Man on The CW series The Flash.

Career 
In March 2013, Sawyer was cast in the role of Kyle Abbott on the CBS Daytime soap opera The Young and the Restless. He made his debut on April 24, 2013. In December of the same year, it was announced that he would exit the role; he made his final appearance on January 27 the following year. In 2014, he starred in the thriller Kept Man, and the Geek & Sundry superhero comedy Caper. In 2015, Sawyer hosted and co-wrote the documentary series Courageous Leaders, and starred in the Wall Street drama SPiN.

In July 2017, Sawyer was cast in The CW's superhero drama The Flash as Ralph Dibny / Elongated Man, a fast-talking private investigator who is able to stretch his body to any shape or form. The character first appears in the fourth episode of the fourth season, titled "Elongated Journey Into Night", which first aired that October. In June of the following year, he was promoted to series regular.

In May 2020, several allegedly racist and misogynist Twitter posts made by Sawyer from 2009 to 2014 resurfaced after Sawyer made comments about the Black Lives Matter movement. Sawyer issued an apology on his Instagram account on May 30 after the tweets resurfaced, saying, "My words, irrelevant of being meant with an intent of humor, were hurtful, and unacceptable. I am ashamed I was capable of these really horrible attempts to get attention at that time. I regret them deeply." Sawyer deleted his Twitter account soon thereafter. A week later, Sawyer was fired from his role in The Flash, with Warner Bros. Television and the CW issuing the statement, "We do not tolerate derogatory remarks that target any race, ethnicity, national origin, gender, or sexual orientation." The series' executive producer, Eric Wallace, and the series' star, Grant Gustin, expressed dismay at Sawyer's actions, with Wallace committing to a change in the working environment on the show. Sawyer has not made any further screen or public appearances since.

Filmography

Film

Television

Web

Accolades

References

External links 

 

1985 births
21st-century American male actors
American male film actors
American male television actors
American male soap opera actors
Emerson College alumni
Living people
Male actors from New York (state)
People from Goshen, New York